Oberea distinctipennis is a species of beetle in the family Cerambycidae. It was described by Maurice Pic in 1902. It is known from Vietnam, China and Laos.

References

distinctipennis
Beetles described in 1902